Killshot, the 1989 novel by author Elmore Leonard, tells the story of a married couple who find themselves in Cape Girardeau, Missouri while on the run from a pair of hitmen.

Plot
Carmen and Wayne Colson live a quiet, suburban life. Carmen is a realtor while Wayne is an ironworker. Suddenly everything is violently changed when they stumble upon an extortion plot hatched by two crooks, Armand "Blackbird" Degas and his partner Richie Nix. While Richie is unstable and impatient, the Blackbird is calm and collected. After Wayne forces the two away with a Sleever Bar, the criminals decide to exact vengeance on the Colsons, leading to a tense climax.

Characters in Killshot
Armand Degas – A Mafia Hit Man
Richie Nix – A Crook
Carmen Colson  – A Realtor
Wayne Colson – Carmen's Husband

References

1989 American novels
Novels by Elmore Leonard
American thriller novels
Novels set in Missouri
Cape Girardeau, Missouri
Novels set in Michigan
Arbor House books
Viking Press books
American novels adapted into films